Konstantin Pamfilov (25 May 1901 – 2 May 1943) was a Soviet statesman. Born in the village Mamonovo in the Dukhovshchinsky Uyezd of Smolensk Governorate in the family of an accountant. In 1915 he graduated two-year college. A member of the Communist Party since 1918. Member of the Civil War. Since 1938 is the People's Commissar of Public Utilities RSFSR. He died of heart failure. The urn with the ashes is in the Kremlin Wall Necropolis.

Literature
 Москва. Энциклопедия. 1980 г.
 Абрамов Алексей. У Кремлёвской стены. - М., Политиздат, 1988. 

1901 births
1943 deaths
People from Smolensk Oblast
People from Dukhovshchinsky Uyezd
Bolsheviks
Government of the Russian Soviet Federative Socialist Republic
Moscow State University alumni
Burials at the Kremlin Wall Necropolis